Qasemabad (also Romanized as Qāsemābād; also known as Qāsemābād-e Pā’īn and Qāsimabad) is a village in Bampur-e Gharbi Rural District, in the Central District of Bampur County, Sistan and Baluchestan Province, Iran. At the 2006 census, its population was 2,196, in 450 families.

Mahtab Norouzi was from this village and she was a master artisan at traditional Baluchi needlework and embroidery for more than 50 years.

References 

Populated places in Bampur County